Karim Hossam (born 8 April 1994) is an Egyptian banned former professional tennis player. Hossam had a career-high ATP singles ranking of 337 achieved in September 2013. Hossam won 4 ITF events on the Futures circuit. He made his ATP main draw debut at the 2014 Qatar ExxonMobil Open, losing to the 5th seed Richard Gasquet 5–7, 1–6 in the first round. Hossam was banned from tennis for life and was fined $15,000 on 3 July 2018 for multiple match-fixing offences, after being found guilty on 16 corruption charges relating to offenses from 2013 to 2017 at ITF Futures tournaments. His younger brother Youssef Hossam was likewise banned from tennis for life, two years later, after he similarly was found guilty of 21 match-fixing and other corruption offences.

See also
Match fixing in tennis

References

External links
 
 
 

1994 births
Living people
Egyptian male tennis players
Sportspeople from Giza
Sportspeople from Cairo
Match fixers
Match fixing in tennis
Sportspeople banned for life
21st-century Egyptian people